Richard II of England (1367–1400) was King of England from 1377 until he was deposed on 30 September 1399.

Richard II may also refer to:

People   
Richard II, Duke of Normandy (c. 980–1026)
Richard II of Aquila (fl. 1156)
Richard II of Capua (died 1105/1106)
Richard M. Daley or Richard II (born 1942), mayor of Chicago, Illinois

Other uses
 Richard II (play), a play by William Shakespeare
 "King Richard the Second", a 1978 episode of BBC Television Shakespeare
 Richard II (2012 film)
 Thomas of Woodstock (play) or Richard II, Part One, a 1590s play treating events prior to Shakespeare's play